The Australian Football League celebrates the best mark of the season through the annual Mark of the Year competition. In 2007, this is officially known as the Toyota AFL Mark of the Year.  Sports Tonight (late edition) shows both the Goal of the Year and Mark of the Year Nominations for the previous round on Wednesday nights.

Winners by Round
Legend

 *Denotes current Round

See also
 Mark of the Year
 Goal of the Year
 2007 AFL Goal of the Year
 2007 AFL Season

External links
 Toyota AFL Mark Of The Year

References 

Australian Football League Awards Seasons Voting
Afl Mark Of The Year, 2007
Mark of the Year
Australian rules football-related lists